Versailles  is a town in Johnson Township, Ripley County, in the U.S. state of Indiana. The population was 2,113 at the 2010 census. The town is the county seat of Ripley County.

History
It was decided in 1818 a county seat should be located at Versailles. The town of Versailles was laid out in 1819. It was named after the Palace of Versailles.

A post office has been in operation at Versailles since 1823.

The Ripley County Courthouse, Fernando G. Taylor House, Tyson United Methodist Church, and Versailles School and Tyson Auditorium are listed on the National Register of Historic Places.

Geography
Versailles is located at  (39.067624, -85.255026).
Laughery Creek is the major stream in the area, and was dammed in 1954 to form 230-acre Versailles Lake, within the Versailles State Park.

Demographics

2010 census
As of the census of 2010, there were 2,113 people, 874 households, and 538 families living in the town. The racial makeup of the town was 98.2% White, 0.2% African American, 0.3% Asian, 0.1% from other races, and 1.2% from two or more races. Hispanic or Latino of any race were 0.4% of the population.

There were 874 households, of which 31.0% had children under the age of 18 living with them, 42.6% were married couples living together, 14.4% had a female householder with no husband present, 4.6% had a male householder with no wife present, and 38.4% were non-families. 33.3% of all households were made up of individuals, and 17.3% had someone living alone who was 65 years of age or older. The average household size was 2.32 and the average family size was 2.95.

The median age in the town was 37.9 years. 23.6% of residents were under the age of 18; 10.6% were between the ages of 18 and 24; 24.5% were from 25 to 44; 25.4% were from 45 to 64; and 15.9% were 65 years of age or older. The gender makeup of the town was 47.5% male and 52.5% female.

2000 census
As of the census of 2000, there were 1,784 people, 746 households, and 492 families living in the town. The racial makeup of the town was 98.82% White, 0.06% African American, 0.45% Native American, 0.17% Asian, 0.11% from other races, and 0.39% from two or more races. Hispanic or Latino of any race were 0.50% of the population.

There were 746 households, out of which 31.6% had children under the age of 18 living with them, 50.4% were married couples living together, 12.5% had a female householder with no husband present, and 34.0% were non-families. 31.5% of all households were made up of individuals, and 16.1% had someone living alone who was 65 years of age or older. The average household size was 2.36 and the average family size was 2.93.

In the town, the population was spread out, with 25.7% under the age of 18, 10.1% from 18 to 24, 26.2% from 25 to 44, 22.2% from 45 to 64, and 15.8% who were 65 years of age or older. The median age was 36 years. For every 100 females, there were 83.9 males. For every 100 females age 18 and over, there were 84.0 males.

The median income for a household in the town was $35,144, and the median income for a family was $41,442. Males had a median income of $31,607 versus $22,237 for females. The per capita income for the town was $17,352. About 8.3% of families and 8.7% of the population were below the poverty line, including 9.3% of those under age 18 and 6.8% of those age 65 or over.

Education
Most students in Versailles attend South Ripley Elementary School for grades K through 6 and South Ripley Junior/Senior High School for grades 7 through 12.

The town has a lending library, the Tyson Public Library.

Notable people
Amos W. Jackson (1904-1972), judge and resident of Versailles
Rowland H. Jackson (1872-1957), politician and resident of Versailles
 Harry Wheeler, 19th Century baseball

References

External links
Town of Versailles

Towns in Ripley County, Indiana
Towns in Indiana
County seats in Indiana